The 1969 Texas 500 was a NASCAR Grand National Series event that was held on December 7, 1969, at Texas World Speedway in College Station, Texas.

Souvenir racing programs were sold at the event for the then-inexpensive cost of $1 USD per copy ($ when adjusted for inflation).

The extra four degrees of banking made the cars  faster than their speeds while racing at Michigan International Speedway.

Race report
Bobby Isaac would win this race in his 1969 Dodge Charger; gaining $15,640 in prize winnings ($ when inflation is taken into effect). He would end an impressive 17-win season with a win in this event.

More than 23,000 race fans would see Donnie Allison lose the race by more than two laps. Don Biederman was the only foreign-born driver (he was born in Port Credit, Ontario) and raced under the employ of Bill Champion for this race in a 1968 Ford Torino. Roy Tyner would finish in last place after picking up an engine problem on lap 2 with his 1969 Pontiac vehicle. Other notable drivers to develop problems in the race were: Elmo Langley, Cale Yarborough, Ed Negre, and Bill Seifert. Wendell Scott (the first African American driver in NASCAR history to win a race), Buddy Baker (who was the highest finishing driver to DNF from the race in 8th place), and Benny Parsons were three other notable drivers of this decade who participated in the race.

Yarborough would acquire a serious injury after clobbering his vehicle into one of the walls.

NASCAR on ABC would begin televising a select number of races during the 1970 NASCAR Grand National Series season. The televised broadcasting of NASCAR races eventually brought this once-regional motorsport into the national spotlight and eventually gained a major sponsor through Big Tobacco manufacturer R.J. Reynolds Tobacco Company for the 1971 season. This alliance between tobacco and stock car racing would last until the 2004 NASCAR Cup Series season. The transition to purpose-built racecars began in the early 1960s and occurred gradually over that decade.  Changes made to the sport by the late 1960s brought an end to the "strictly stock" vehicles of the 1950s.

Biederman would make his grand exit from the NASCAR Cup Series after this race while Joe Hines would make his introduction into top-level stock car racing here. David Pearson would eventually merge as the eventual champion for the year. Pearson would later be recognized for winning his races more consistently than Richard Petty (who finished 21st in this race and would stop racing in Ford vehicles after this race) but would have an abbreviated racing career compared to him.

Notable crew chiefs for this race were Herb Nab, Harry Hyde, Dale Inman, Banjo Matthews, Glen Wood, Dick Hutcherson, and Cotton Owens.

Qualifying

Finishing order
Section reference: 

 Bobby Isaac† (No. 71)
 Donnie Allison (No. 27)
 Benny Parsons† (No. 18)
 James Hylton† (No. 48)
 Dick Brooks† (No. 32)
 Ray Elder† (No. 96)
 Jack McCoy (No. 7)
 Buddy Baker*† (No. 6)
 Dave Marcis (No. 30)
 LeeRoy Yarbrough*† (No. 98)
 Cecil Gordon† (No. 47)
 Jabe Thomas† (No. 25)
 E. J. Trivette (No. 08)
 Johnny Halford† (No. 57)
 Friday Hassler*† (No.39)
 Neil Castles (No. 06)
 Henley Gray (No. 19)
 Wendell Scott† (No. 34)
 Don Biederman† (No. 70)
 H. B. Bailey*† (No. 36)
 Richard Petty* (No. 43)
 Dave Alonzo (No. 81)
 Bobby Allison* (No. 22)
 Earl Brooks*† (No. 26)
 Cale Yarborough* (No. 21)
 David Pearson*† (No. 17)
 Elmo Langley*† (No.64)
 Bill Shirey* (No. 74)
 Ben Arnold* (No. 76)
 Frank Warren* (No.8)
 Bill Champion*† (No. 10)
 John Sears*† (No. 4)
 Richard Brickhouse* (No. 99)
 Joe Hines* (No.03)
 Ed Negre*† (No. 0)
 Bill Seifert* (No. 45)
 Larry Baumel* (No. 69)
 Roy Tyner*† (No. 9)

† signifies that the driver is known to be deceased 
* Driver failed to finish race

References

Texas 500
Texas 500
NASCAR races at Texas World Speedway